Papi chulo ("cute daddy" in Caribbean Spanish) is a Spanish term of endearment for males.

Papi chulo may also refer to:
"Papi Chulo", 1997 song by Funkdoobiest
"Papi chulo... (te traigo el mmmm...)", 2003 song by Lorna
Papi Chulo (film), 2018 American-Irish comedy-drama film
"Papi Chulo" (Octavian and Skepta song), 2020 rap song
 the TNA stage name of Mexican wrestler Mr. Águila